Founded in 1988, the Swiss Chamber of Commerce and Industry in Singapore (SwissCham) is a non-profit organization advocating Swiss business in Singapore through offering to its members a networking platform with a broad range of events as well as selective services and benefits. The SwissCham fosters business ties and friendship between Swiss and Singaporean companies, which dating back for more than 200 years. Formerly known as the Swiss Business Association (“SBA”), it acts as the spokesperson of Swiss business interests in Singapore towards Singaporean and Swiss authorities as well as other chambers and business groups, cultivating the Swiss networking culture in Singapore and the region.

History
 
Being already present in Singapore for soon 200 years, Swiss companies intensified their activities and strengthened their presence in Singapore soon after it became a sovereign nation in 1965 and Switzerland decided to establish diplomatic relationships with the city-state in 1967. Swiss investments have been among the top five foreign direct investments (FDI) ever since, demonstrated by already more than 100 Swiss companies having had a presence in Singapore by the end of the 1980s. The need for an official forum to help these companies exchanging ideas and accessing information became increasingly important. In 1988, with the help of the Swiss Ambassador Kurt O. Wyss, the SBA was founded by a group of visionary Swiss-Singaporean businessmen and entrepreneurs. After representing and serving its members for over 25 years, the SBA committee conducted in 2015 a strategic review of its activities, vision and mission. With a transformation roadmap and revised statutes approved by the annual general meeting in 2016, the SBA got rebranded to the Swiss Chamber of Commerce and Industry in Singapore in 2017, underlining its continuous efforts to raise awareness on its work as a chamber of commerce and industry and staying relevant in a fast and constantly changing world. This sharpened focus of its activities included a variety of new initiatives such as a professionalized online presence and digital communication concept throughout 2016 as well as in 2017 the launch of the inaugural Swiss Business Award honoring “Excellence in People & Skills Development”.

Core activities

The mandate of the SwissCham is to represent and advocate its members’ interests and offer a platform for practicing and living the Swiss networking culture, following the overarching goal of promoting and fostering the Swiss trade, services, manufacturing and investments in Singapore. Its core activities are grouped in four main pillars: Firstly, a 360 degree networking platform for interacting among members as well as with other Singaporean companies and professionals, other chambers of commerce as well as other Swiss organizations in Singapore. Secondly, a broad range of attractive events including member presentations, knowledge sharing or cultural and social events to get a better understanding of Singapore, its history and the resulting business and networking culture. Thirdly, advocating work for its members interests towards the Swiss authorities in Switzerland and in Singapore, towards the local authorities in Singapore (primarily through its standing seat in the board of governors of the European Chamber of Commerce in Singapore), and towards other business organizations through regular interactions in industry group meetings. And fourthly, a selective range of services and benefits offered to its members, including an online FAQ with key knowledge for setting up and running a business in Singapore from a Swiss perspective, or on-demand support for members with regards to business relevant topics such as access to relevant industry or market data, or regulatory or labour market aspects.

Swiss Business Award honoring 'Excellence in People & Skills Development'
 

The Swiss Business Award introduced in 2017 rewards and recognizes Singapore-based companies for their efforts and initiatives in developing their workforce through ‘Excellence in People & Skills Development’. Education and talent development are particularly relevant for Singapore and Switzerland, both of which having repeatedly topped worldwide educational rankings such as the Programme for International Student Assessment published each year by the Organisation for Economic Co-operation and Development, or the Global Innovation Index published each year by INSEAD and the World Intellectual Property Organization. The nominations for the Swiss Business Award are evaluated by an independent jury consisting of high ranking representatives from business and academia in Singapore. Singapore-based Firmenich Asia Pte. Ltd. won the inaugural Swiss Business Award in 2017 for its dedication to local workforce. In 2018, Marché Mövenpick won the Swiss Business Award dedication to the skills development of its employees. Marché cooperates with local schools, such as polytechnics and Institute of Higher Education (ITE), to offer internship opportunities to students.

Members
 
While its founding members had mostly a link to the financial industry, the member base of the SwissCham grew to over 200 corporate members by 2018, from start-up companies and well established SMEs to large multinationals, representing all major industries of Swiss business in Singapore.

Chairmen
 Hans-Rudolf Schaub (1988)
 Peter Schlumpf (1989-1991)
 Marco Fleischmann (1992-1996)
 Alex Widmer (1997)
 Rolf Gerber (1998-2002)
 Manfred Rist (2003-2005)
 Pius Eberhard (2006-2008)
 Christian Pauli (2008-2014)
 Peter Huber (2014-2015)
 Dr. Tom Ludescher (2015 - 2019)
 Georg von Wattenwyl (2019–present)

References

Chambers of commerce
Business organisations based in Singapore
Business organisations based in Switzerland